Walter Perez (born July 12, 1982) is a Mexican-American film actor, television actor and musician. He is best known for his role in Fame.

Early life and education
Walter Perez was born in South Gate, California, and is of Mexican descent. He started performing when he was seven years old as a flamenco dancer in elementary school recitals. At a young age, Perez developed a passion for acting and joined Colors United, a performing arts group for inner-city high school students. Perez attended California State University, Fullerton, where he studied and earned a bachelor's degree in criminal justice.

Career
Perez began his career in 2002. He has guest starred in The Closer, CSI: Crime Scene Investigation, CSI: Miami, A Beautiful Life, and had a five-episode role on Friday Night Lights. In 2010 he guest starred in Cold Case, NCIS: Los Angeles and In Plain Sight. He has been in many independent films, including August Evening. In August Evening he plays Luis, kind-hearted butcher who falls in love with the widow, Lupe. Walter starred in Emilio, another popular independent film. He also played Al Crisotomo in the television movie, Walkout on HBO; and co-starred alongside Dermot Mulroney and Diane Kruger in Run for Your Life. Perez is best known for his role in Fame, an updated version of the 1980 film.

Walter won Outstanding Performance for his role in August Evening at 2007 Los Angeles Film Festival in the independent film, August Evening, which won the John Cassavetes Award.

Personal life
Perez enjoys playing piano, and different instruments after learning how to in Fame. He spends his downtime free riding in the Santa Monica Mountains. Walter Perez enjoying free riding with his closest friends.

Filmography

Film

Television

References

External links
 

1982 births
Living people
American male film actors
American male television actors
American male actors of Mexican descent
American people of Mexican descent
Mexican male film actors
People from South Gate, California
Male actors from California